Men's Combined World Cup 1991/1992

Final point standings

In Men's Combined World Cup 1991/92 all three results count.

Note:

In all races not all points were awarded (not enough finishers).

References
 fis-ski.com

World Cup
FIS Alpine Ski World Cup men's combined discipline titles